Polatlı HSR station, short for Polatlı High Speed Rail station ( short for Polatlı Yüksek Hızlı Tren Garı) is a railway station serving the Ankara–Istanbul high-speed railway just southeast of Polatlı. The station was opened on 16 February 2011, two years after the opening of the railway between Ankara and Eskişehir, and is the first railway station in Turkey to be dedicated to high-speed rail. Polatlı YHT is served by two tracks via side platforms with two express tracks in middle, as not all scheduled YHT trains stop at Polatlı.

Mainline trains operating along the Istanbul–Ankara railway do not serve the YHT station, operating into the more central Polatlı railway station. All mainline train service however has been suspended until 15 November 2018.

Station Layout

References

External links
Polatlı YHT Garı

Railway stations in Ankara Province
Polatlı
Railway stations opened in 2011
High-speed railway stations in Turkey
2011 establishments in Turkey
Transport in Ankara Province
Buildings and structures in Ankara Province